The Banque Canadienne Nationale was a bank based in the province of Quebec, Canada. It was formed in 1924 from the merger of the Banque d'Hochelaga and the Banque Nationale, and operated until 1979, when it became part of the National Bank of Canada.

History
In 1859, several prominent Quebecers founded the Banque Nationale in Quebec City as a banking institution controlled by French-speaking businessmen.

In 1924, the Banque Nationale, which was struggling financially while caught-up in a serious recession, merged with the Banque d'Hochelaga (founded in Montreal in 1874) to create the Banque Canadienne Nationale (BCN, Canadian National Bank). The Quebec provincial government, under Alexandre Taschereau, issued $15 million in bonds to facilitate the merger.

Like the other Canadian chartered banks, BCN issued its own paper currency until the Bank of Canada Act of 1934 created the Bank of Canada and it relinquished this right.

In 1968, Banque Canadienne Nationale was one of the four original banks to form CHARGEX Ltd. through a licence from BankAmericard, providing Canada with its first interbank credit card.

In 1979, Banque Canadienne Nationale and the Provincial Bank of Canada (Banque provinciale du Canada), another Quebec-based bank, joined to form the National Bank of Canada.

See also
 List of Canadian banks
 500 Place D'Armes

References

Banque canadienne nationale, 1874-1974: cent ans d'histoire. Banque Canadienne Nationale; 1974.

Defunct banks of Canada
Banks established in 1859
Banks disestablished in 1979
1979 disestablishments in Quebec
National Bank of Canada
Canadian companies established in 1859
1859 establishments in Quebec
Canadian companies disestablished in 1979